Qasemabad (also Romanized as Qāsemābād; also known as Qal‘eh-ye Qāsemābād) is a village in Ramand-e Shomali Rural District, Khorramdasht District, Takestan County, Qazvin Province, Iran. At the 2006 census, its population was 598, in 177 families.

References 

Populated places in Takestan County